Holmwood is a civil parish in Surrey, England. 

Holmwood may also refer to:

 Holmwood, Redditch, a large house built by Temple Lushington Moore
 Holmwood, Western Australia
 Holmwood Estate, a tea estate in Sri Lanka
 Holmwood railway station, Surrey, England
 Holmwood House, Glasgow, an elaborate villa designed by Scottish architect Alexander "Greek" Thomson
 North Holmwood, Surrey, England
 South Holmwood, Surrey, England

See also
Holmewood, a village in Derbyshire, England